Bashir Niaz (July 9, 1936 - August 5, 2002) was a Pakistani film story, dialogue, and screenwriter. He is known for writing scripts/dialogues for blockbuster movies like "Diya aur tofaan" (1969),"Aina" (1977), and "Bandish" (1980). He won 15 Nigar Awards as a dialogue/scriptwriter.

Early life
Bashir Niaz was born on July 9, 1936, in Jamke Chattha, Gujranwala District, Punjab, British India (now Punjab, Pakistan). He graduated from Government Islamia College, Lahore. Then he joined journalism and worked for several magazines and journals. Later he turned towards film journalism and served for weekly Nigar.

Career
Bashir Niaz started his career as a screenwriter in 1963 when he wrote a script for movie, "Chhoti Behan". Initially he teamed up with directors like Shabab kiranvi, K. Khurshid, and Haider Chowdhri. Later he developed a professional understanding with the director Nazar-ul-Islam.
Bashir Niaz was known as "the magician of dialogues" and he was exceptionally good at creating witty, emotional, and dramatic dialogues for general public. In 1980, he was asked to write a Pakistani version of a Hollywood film Random Harvest (1942) and he came up with a brilliant script for "Bandish", a platinum jubilee hit of the year. During his long career as a screenwriter, he wrote stories and dialogues for many successful Urdu and Punjabi films.

Filmography
Some of the popular films of Bashir Niaz as a writer are:
 Ehsaas (1972)
 Naukar Wohti Da (1974)
 Aina (1977)
 Ambar (1978)
 Parakh (1978)
 Zindagi (1978)
 Shola (1978)
 Bandish (1980)
 Noukar te maalik (1982)
 Doorian (1984)
 Dhee rani (1985)
 Hum eik hain (1986)
 Janbaaz (1987)
 Mukhra (1988)
 Zakhmi Aurat (1989)
 Chahat (1992)
 Rani Beti Raaj kare Gi (1994)

Awards
Bashir Niaz received his first Nigar Award for movie, "Ehsaas" (1972). Then,as a story/dialogue/screenwriter, he won record 15 Nigar Awards from 1972 to 1994 for both Urdu and Punjabi films .

Death
Bashir Niaz suffered from first heart attack in 1998. He died on August 5, 2002, in London and was buried in Samanabad graveyard, Lahore.

References

1936 births
2002 deaths
People from Gujranwala
Pakistani screenwriters